The  is a compact crossover SUV (C-segment) produced by the Japanese automaker Toyota since 2020. Adopting the Corolla nameplate, it is positioned as a more practical and larger alternative to the C-HR and built on the same TNGA-C (GA-C) platform as the E210 series Corolla. By size, the Corolla Cross is positioned between the smaller C-HR—with which it shares a platform—and the larger RAV4, in Toyota's global crossover SUV lineup.

It was first unveiled in Thailand in July 2020 along with other Southeast Asian markets and Taiwan in the same year, while its introduction in other markets started in 2021.

The twin model of the Corolla Cross, called the Toyota Frontlander, is available exclusively in China and was introduced in late 2021.

Overview 
The Corolla Cross is the second Toyota crossover built on the GA-C platform, after the smaller C-HR which was launched in 2016. The vehicle shares the same  wheelbase as the C-HR, but occupies a larger footprint prioritising on interior space and practicality. For the front-wheel drive models, it is equipped with a MacPherson strut front suspension and a torsion beam rear suspension instead of an independent rear suspension used on the regular Corolla and the C-HR to save interior space and cut costs, while all-wheel drive models still come with rear independent units. Development was led by chief engineer Daizo Kameyama.

The interior is shared with the regular Corolla, with minor redesigns.

, the Corolla Cross is produced in Japan, Thailand, Taiwan, Brazil, United States, Malaysia, China, and South Africa.

Powertrain 

Hybrid variants uses either a 1.8-litre 2ZR-FXE or a 2.0-litre M20A-FXS four-cylinder petrol engines.

Markets

Asia

Japan 
The Japanese market Corolla Cross was unveiled on 14 September 2021, with a differentiated front fascia from the global model (later shared with the Chinese market Frontlander and the North American market Corolla Cross Hybrid S/SE/XSE), headlight and taillight clusters (later shared with the European model), and the dedicated Corolla "C" front logo. Grade levels available are "X", G, S and Z, and is offered with a either 1.8-litre 2ZR-FAE petrol or a 1.8-litre 2ZR-FXE hybrid petrol engines. "E-Four" all-wheel drive is optional for the latter. Independent multi-link rear suspension setup is standard for E-Four models, while a panoramic roof is available for higher grades.

Thailand 
The Corolla Cross for the Thai market was launched on 9 July 2020. It was initially offered in 1.8 Sport, Hybrid Smart, Hybrid Premium and Hybrid Premium Safety grade levels. The Hybrid Premium Safety grade is equipped with Toyota Safety Sense. In September 2021, the Corolla Cross is given the Modellista accessories package on top of existing variants in Thailand. The GR Sport grade was released in November 2021 with a redesigned front fascia. The base Sport grade was replaced by Sport Plus grade in late November 2022.

Vietnam 
The Corolla Cross for the Vietnamese market was launched on 5 August 2020. It is offered in 1.8 G, 1.8 V and 1.8 Hybrid grade levels. The 1.8 V and 1.8 Hybrid grades are equipped with Toyota Safety Sense.

Indonesia 
The Indonesian market Corolla Cross was launched on 6 August 2020 and is offered in one petrol and hybrid models. Due to low sales, the conventional petrol model was no longer distributed to the dealers since August 2021. The hybrid GR Sport grade was introduced on 16 February 2023.

Philippines 
The Corolla Cross for the Philippine market was launched on 20 August 2020 and initially offered in 1.8 G and 1.8 V Hybrid grade levels. The hybrid GR Sport variant was later introduced in March 2022.

Brunei 
The Corolla Cross (marketed as "Cross") for the Bruneian market was launched on 21 August 2020. It is only offered with a 1.8-litre 2ZR-FE petrol engine in Standard or High grade levels.

The 1.8-litre hybrid variant was introduced in October 2022.

Myanmar 
The Corolla Cross for the Burmese market was launched on 4 September 2020 and is only offered in 1.8 V petrol model. The 1.8 V grade is equipped with Toyota Safety Sense.

Taiwan 
The Corolla Cross for the Taiwanese market was launched on 12 October 2020. It is offered in 1.8 G, 1.8 V and 1.8 Hybrid grade levels. All grades are equipped with Toyota Safety Sense. The hybrid GR Sport grade was launched on 14 September 2021.

Malaysia 
The Corolla Cross for the Malaysian market was launched on 25 March 2021. Initial grade levels were 1.8 G and 1.8 V. Both grades were offered with the 1.8-litre 2ZR-FE engine paired with continuously variable transmission (CVT). The V grade is equipped with Toyota Safety Sense. The early batch of the car were imported from Thailand, while locally assembled model went on sale in October 2021 along with the introduction of the hybrid model. The hybrid version was launched on 14 January 2022. Deliveries for all CKD models started in early 2022.

The GR Sport grade (based on 1.8 V grade) was introduced on 17 February 2023.

China 
The Corolla Cross for the Chinese market is produced and marketed by FAW Toyota, while its twin model, known as the Frontlander is produced and marketed by GAC Toyota. Both the Corolla Cross and Frontlander was unveiled at the Guangzhou Auto Show in November 2021. The Frontlander adopts the Japanese model's front and rear styling. The Frontlander is powered with a 2.0-litre M20C-FKS engine, while the Corolla Cross is powered with a M20E-FKS unit. It is positioned as the entry-level SUV of Toyota in the market with a lower pricing compared to the C-HR/IZOA.

Europe 
The Corolla Cross went on sale in 2022 to compete in the C-segment SUV space. An all-wheel drive model (AWD-i) is available with an additional rear electric motor producing . It is equipped with the Japanese-model headlight and taillight clusters, while equipment list included panoramic roof, 12.3-inch instrument panel and a 10.5-inch central display.

Americas

Brazil 
The Corolla Cross was revealed in Brazil on 12 March 2021. Locally manufactured at the Sorocaba plant, it is powered by either a direct-injected 2.0-litre M20A-FKB flex fuel petrol engine for XR and XRE grade levels, or a 1.8-litre 2ZR-FXE hybrid flex fuel unit for XRV and XRX grade levels. Toyota targeted the hybrid version to contribute 30 percent of Corolla Cross total sales in the country. It is also exported to 22 countries in Latin America and the Caribbean.

North America 
The Corolla Cross for the North American market was unveiled on 2 June 2021. The first vehicle to be built at the Mazda Toyota Manufacturing USA plant in Huntsville, Alabama, the production began on 30 September 2021. Initially only available with a 2.0-litre M20A-FKS petrol engine paired with the K120 "Direct Shift" CVT, it was offered in L, LE and XLE grade levels in the United States and Canada, and in LE grade in Mexico, with an all-wheel drive system available as an option in former two markets.

The hybrid model with standard all-wheel drive debuted in June 2022 for the 2023 model year. Powered by a 2.0-litre M20A-FXS hybrid petrol engine, it is offered in LE, XLE, S, SE, and XSE grade levels. The S, SE, and XSE grades are newly introduced for the 2023 model year, which adopts the Japanese market Corolla Cross and the Chinese market Frontlander front fascia design and is equipped with a sport-tuned suspension.

Africa

Kenya 
The Corolla Cross was launched in Kenya on 18 November 2020 and is only offered with a 1.8-litre 2ZR-FE petrol engine in Limited and Executive grade levels.

South Africa 
The Corolla Cross went on sale in South Africa in November 2021, available in Xi, XS, and XR grade levels. Produced locally at the Toyota South Africa Motors plant, it is powered by either a 1.8-litre 2ZR-FE petrol or a 1.8-litre 2ZR-FXE hybrid petrol engines. Four styling packages were offered: X-Over, Urban Sport, Adventure, and Hybrid.

Oceania

Australia 
The Corolla Cross was announced for the Australian market in August 2022, and went on sale on 12 October 2022. Imported from Japan and sharing the styling with the European market Corolla Cross, the grade levels offered are GX, GXL and Atmos with either a 2.0-litre M20A-FKS petrol or a 2.0-litre M20A-FXS hybrid petrol engines. All-wheel drive option is available for hybrid models.

New Zealand 
The Corolla Cross for New Zealand market went on sale on 13 October 2022. Like the Australian model, it is imported from Japan and also shares the styling with the European market Corolla Cross. Grade levels offered are GX, GXL and Limited with either a 2.0-litre M20A-FKS petrol or a 2.0-litre M20A-FXS hybrid petrol engines. All-wheel drive option is available for hybrid models.

Concept models

Corolla Cross H2 Concept 

The Corolla Cross H2 Concept is a Corolla Cross prototype fitted with a modified G16E-GTS engine to run with hydrogen fuel.

Safety 
The US market Corolla Cross was awarded the "Top Safety Pick+" by the Insurance Institute for Highway Safety in 2021. It received overall Good and Superior ratings on all categories except headlights, as only the XLE trim with Adaptive Front Lighting System received the Good rating while the other trims were rated Acceptable.

Awards 
The Corolla Cross was awarded as the 2022 South African Car of the Year.

Sales

References

External links 

  (US)

Cross
Cars introduced in 2020
Compact sport utility vehicles
Crossover sport utility vehicles
Front-wheel-drive vehicles
All-wheel-drive vehicles
Hybrid sport utility vehicles
Partial zero-emissions vehicles
Vehicles with CVT transmission
Motor vehicles manufactured in the United States
Euro NCAP small off-road